Mitry–Claye is a railway station near Paris, France. It is in the commune of Mitry-Mory, and also serves nearby Claye-Souilly. It is served by regional Transilien trains and the Paris RER trains, so is an important transit point.

See also
 List of stations of the Paris RER

External links

 

Railway stations in France opened in 1861
Railway stations in Seine-et-Marne
Réseau Express Régional stations